Fiola is a surname. Notable people with the surname include:

Attila Fiola (born 1990), Hungarian footballer
Eddie Fiola (born 1964), American freestyle BMX rider
Christopher Fiola (born 1996), Canadian Long Track Speed Skater

Other uses
 Fiola (restaurant), a Michelin-starred restaurant in Washington, D.C.

See also
Fiðla
Fjolla